Sitthideth Khanthavong (born 2 September 1994) is a Laotian professional footballer who played as a striker for Lao Toyota FC in the Lao Premier League. He was banned for life from football-related activities as a result of match-fixing, along with 21 other players of the Laotian national side and Lao Toyota.

References

External links 
 
 

1994 births
Living people
Laotian footballers
Yotha F.C. players
Lao Toyota F.C. players
Laos international footballers
Association football forwards
Laotian male sprinters
Athletes (track and field) at the 2010 Summer Youth Olympics
Footballers at the 2014 Asian Games
Sportspeople banned for life
Sportspeople involved in betting scandals
People from Vientiane
Asian Games competitors for Laos